Molybdenum oxytetrachloride is the inorganic compound with the formula MoOCl4.  This thermally unstable, dark green solid is used to prepare other complexes of molybdenum. It adopts a square pyramidal structure of C4v symmetry. As for other Mo(VI) compounds, it is diamagnetic.  It decomposes thermally to MoOCl3.

Preparation
It is prepared by treating molybdenum pentachloride with oxygen.  It also arises by chlorination of molybdenum trioxide:
MoO3 +  2 SOCl2  →  MoOCl4  +  2 SO2

See also
 Molybdenum dichloride dioxide

References

Oxychlorides
Molybdenum(VI) compounds